Siguinvoussé may refer to several places in Burkina Faso:
Siguinvoussé, a village in Absouya Department, Boulgou Province, Centre-Est Region 
Siguinvoussé, a village in Garango Department, Boulgou Province, Centre-Est Region
Siguinvoussé, a village in Sabcé Department, Bam Province, Centre-Nord Region
Siguinvoussé, a village in Yé Department, Nayala Province, Boucle du Mouhoun Region
Siguinvoussé, a village in Zimtenga Department, Bam Province, Centre-Nord Region